Glucose-6-phosphatase, catalytic subunit (glucose 6-phosphatase alpha) is an enzyme that in humans is encoded by the G6PC gene.

Glucose-6-phosphatase is an integral membrane protein of the endoplasmic reticulum that catalyzes the hydrolysis of D-glucose 6-phosphate to D-glucose and orthophosphate. It is a key enzyme in glucose homeostasis, functioning in gluconeogenesis and glycogenolysis.  Defects in the enzyme cause glycogen storage disease type I (von Gierke disease).

Interactive pathway map

See also
 G6PC2
 G6PC3
 glucose 6-phosphatase
 glycogen storage disease type I

References

Further reading